The Faculty of Physics and Astronomy is one of twelve faculties at the University of Heidelberg. It comprises the Kirchhoff Institute of Physics, the Institute of Physics, Theoretical Physics, Environmental Physics and Theoretical Astrophysics.

Kirchhoff Institute of Physics

The Kirchhoff-Institut für Physik (Kirchhoff Institute of Physics, KIP), built in 2002, is a research institute located in Heidelberg, Germany.  It shares faculty with the physics and astronomy departments at the University of Heidelberg.  The institute is named after Gustav Kirchhoff, who collaborated in Heidelberg in 1854 with Robert Bunsen in spectroscopic work.

The scope of its research is broad. Many projects exist, from low temperature physics and neuronal information processing to surface physics.

Facilities include (apart from several laboratories)  a cleanroom, an ASIC laboratory, an experimental hall and, as it is also serves undergraduates, there are 2 auditoriums with a capacity of over 300 people, several seminar rooms and a CIP pool. Current director is Prof. Dr. Markus Oberthaler.

Research interests include:
 Biophysics
 Complex Quantum Systems condensed matter systems at ultra-low temperatures and matter waves.
 Particle Physics calorimetry and trigger processor development for the ATLAS and H1 particle detectors.
 Technical Computer Science

Institute of Physics

Institute of Theoretical Physics

Institute of Environmental Physics

The Institute of Environmental Physics was founded in 1975. Its current director is Prof. Dr. Norbert Frank.

Research Interests
 Atmosphere and Remote Sensing, Radiative Transfer and Solar Energy Deposition
 Terrestrial Systems, Water Flow, Solute Transport and Permafrost 
 Aquatic Systems, Groundwater and Paleoclimate, and Limnology 
 Small-Scale Air-Sea Interaction, Image Processing
 Atmospheric Aerosols, Aerosols and Climate

Center for Astronomy
The Zentrum für Astronomie der Universität Heidelberg (Center for Astronomy of Heidelberg University) was founded in 2005 and is an association of three research institutes: the Astronomical Calculation Institute, the Institute of Theoretical Astrophysics and the Landessternwarte Heidelberg-Königstuhl (the Heidelberg-Königstuhl State Observatory).

Astronomical Calculations Institute

The Astromomisches Rechen-Institut (Astronomical Calculation Institute) is part of the Center of Astronomy of the University of Heidelberg. Before it was a research institute for astrometry and stellar dynamics belonging to the state of Baden-Württemberg.

It is the most important international institution for astronomical data calculations. The Astronomisches Rechen-Institut is responsible among other things for the Gliese catalog of nearby stars, the fundamental catalog FK5 and FK6 and the annual published Apparent places, a high precision catalog with pre-calculated positions for over 3 thousand stars for each day.

The ARI was founded in 1700 in Berlin-Dahlem by Gottfried Kirch. It has its origin from the catalog patent application in this time by Frederick I of Prussia, who introduced a monopoly on publishing star catalogs in Prussia. In 1945 the Institute was moved by the occupying force (Americans) nearer to their headquarters in Heidelberg. Since January 1, 2005 it has been integrated into the Center of Astronomy and as of today is not limited to publishing star catalogs but has a wide research scope.

Institute of Theoretical Astrophysics
The Institute of Theoretical Astrophysics was founded in 1976.

Research Interest
 Cosmology, Gravitational lensing and Galaxy groups and clusters
 Star formation, interstellar turbulences and development of galactic gas clouds
 Planet formation, through gravitation collapse of interstellar molecular gas clouds
 Accretion discs, theory of accretion discs, winds and mass loss from discs

Notes and references

Heidelberg University
Gustav Kirchhoff